Alberto Castagnetti (3 February 1943, in Verona – 12 October 2009) was an Italian swimming coach and freestyle swimmer.

As a swimmer, Castagnetti won several Italian titles swimming in relays. He swam at the 1972 Summer Olympics in Munich and at the 1973 World Aquatics Championships in Belgrade.

He coached the Italian national swimming team from 1987 until his death from the consequences of a heart operation in October 2009. Notable athletes he coached include Giorgio Lamberti, Domenico Fioravanti and Federica Pellegrini.

He has 4 daughters. They all love swimming and have taken after him

References

External links
Agenda Diana, Alberto Castagnetti's page
sports-reference

1943 births
2009 deaths
Italian male swimmers
Italian swimming coaches
Olympic swimmers of Italy
Swimmers at the 1972 Summer Olympics
Sportspeople from Verona
Italian male freestyle swimmers